The Maine Black Bears football program from 1892 to 1899 represented the University of Maine in its first decade of intercollegiate football.

1892

The 1892 Maine Black Bears football team was an American football team that represented the University of Maine during the 1892 college football season. In its first season of intercollegiate football, the team compiled a 0–2 record. Chesley Johnston was the coach, and Harry Smith was the team captain.

Schedule

1893

The 1893 Maine Black Bears football team was an American football team that represented the University of Maine during the 1893 college football season. In its second season of intercollegiate football, the team compiled a 0–5 record. Wildes Veazie was the coach, and Marcus Urann was the team captain.

Schedule

1894

The 1894 Maine Black Bears football team was an American football team that represented the University of Maine during the 1894 college football season. In its third season of intercollegiate football, the team compiled a 0–1 record. The team had no coach. Harvey White was the team captain.

Schedule

1895

The 1895 Maine Black Bears football team was an American football team that represented the University of Maine during the 1895 college football season. In its fourth season of intercollegiate football, the team compiled a 1–4 record. The team recorded the first victory in program history against Foxcroft Academy, a preparatory school in Dover-Foxcroft, Maine. P. Folsom was the coach. Haller Seavey and Charles Pearce were the team captains.

Schedule

1896

The 1896 Maine Black Bears football team was an American football team that represented the University of Maine during the 1896 college football season. In its fifth season of intercollegiate football, the team compiled a 1–3–2 record. The team recorded the second victory in program history against Bates College. Jack Abbott was the coach, and Charles Sawyer was the team captain.

Schedule

1897

The 1897 Maine Black Bears football team was an American football team that represented the University of Maine during the 1897 college football season. In its sixth season of intercollegiate football, the team compiled a 1–2 record. The team recorded the third victory in program history against MIT. Harry Orman Robinson was the coach, and Charles Sawyer was the team captain.

Schedule

1898

The 1898 Maine Black Bears football team was an American football team that represented the University of Maine during the 1898 college football season. In its seventh season of intercollegiate football, the team compiled a 1–4 record. Jim Coombs was the coach, and Allen Bird was the team captain.

Schedule

1899

The 1899 Maine Black Bears football team was an American football team that represented the University of Maine during the 1899 college football season. In its eighth season of intercollegiate football, the team compiled a 2–3 record. W. B. Hopkins was the coach, and Allen Bird was the team captain.

Schedule

References

1892–1899
Maine
Maine Black Bears football
Maine Black Bears football
Maine Black Bears football
Maine Black Bears football
Maine Black Bears football
Maine Black Bears football
Maine Black Bears football
Maine Black Bears football
Maine Black Bears football
Maine Black Bears football
Maine Black Bears football
Maine Black Bears football
Maine Black Bears football
Maine Black Bears football
Maine Black Bears football